Sarcee Mountain is located in the Lewis Range, Glacier National Park in the U.S. state of Montana. Sarcee Mountain is in the northeastern region of the park.

See also
 Mountains and mountain ranges of Glacier National Park (U.S.)

References

Sarcee
Sarcee
Lewis Range
Mountains of Montana